Alejandro Gutiérrez Gutiérrez (born 16 November 1956) is a Mexican politician affiliated with the Institutional Revolutionary Party. He was a member of the L legislature of the Congress of Coahuila. He was a deputy of the LVI (1997 to 2000) legislature of the Mexican Congress, and a senator of the LVIII (2000 to 2003) and LIX (2003 to 2006) legislatures  representing Coahuila.

References

1956 births
Living people
Politicians from Saltillo
Members of the Senate of the Republic (Mexico)
Members of the Chamber of Deputies (Mexico)
Institutional Revolutionary Party politicians
20th-century Mexican politicians
21st-century Mexican politicians
Universidad Anáhuac México alumni
Members of the Congress of Coahuila